Rex Edward Enright (March 19, 1901 – April 6, 1960) was an American football and basketball player, coach, and college athletics administrator.  He played college football and college basketball at the University of Notre Dame in the 1920s.  After graduating from Notre Dame in 1926, he played professional football in the National Football League with the Green Bay Packers for two seasons.  Enright served as the head football coach at the University of South Carolina from 1938 to 1942 and again from 1946 to 1956, compiling a record of 64–69–7.  He was also the head basketball coach at the University of Georgia from 1931 to 1938 and at South Carolina for one season in 1942–43, tallying a career college basketball coaching record of 82–62.

Early life and playing career
Enright was the son of James E. Enright (March 1871 –  ?) and May C. Billick (January 1882 – ?). He was born in Rockford, Illinois.  He graduated from Central High School in Rockford, where he played on the 1918 state champion basketball team, and was team captain and  played running back on the football team. He then graduated from the University of Notre Dame where he played running back for Knute Rockne on the football team, and also played on the Irish basketball team. Enright played fullback for the Green Bay Packers in 1926 and 1927.

Coaching career
In the early 1930s, Enright was an assistant football coach at the University of North Carolina at Chapel Hill. From 1931 to 1938, he was the head basketball coach at the University of Georgia and assistant football coach. In 1938, he was hired as head football coach and athletic director at the University of South Carolina. After the 1942 season, he joined the United States Navy serving as a lieutenant and working mostly in their athletic program in the United States. He completed his service in the navy in 1946, and returned to the Gamecocks as head football coach succeeding John D. McMillan, and remained until 1955 when he resigned for health reasons. He hired Warren Giese as his successor, and continued as athletic director until 1960. The Rex Enright Athletic Center on the South Carolina campus was named for him and the Rex Enright Award (also known as the Captain's Cup) given to the football captains of the previous season. He was considered one of the "ring leaders" in the formation of the Atlantic Coast Conference in 1953.

Personal life, death, and honors
Enright was to married Alice Thoren (1903–1971). They had daughters: Jean (1926–2015), Joyce, and Alice. Enright died on April 6, 1960, from peptic ulcers and rheumatic heart lesions, at Columbia Hospital in Columbia, South Carolina. He had been admitted to the hospital a week earlier.

Enright is a member of the South Carolina Athletic Hall of Fame. In 2009, the University of South Carolina recognized Enright as the winningest football coach in school history. His record 64 wins was highlighted during the halftime show of South Carolina's football game versus Florida Atlantic on September 19, where Enright's daughter, Jean Smith, and great-grandson, Brian Garrett, accepted the presentation in his memory. That record lasted only two more years until Steve Spurrier passed him in 2011.

Head coaching record

Football

See also
 List of college football head coaches with non-consecutive tenure

References

External links
 
 

1901 births
1960 deaths
American football fullbacks
American men's basketball players
Basketball coaches from Illinois
Basketball players from Illinois
Forwards (basketball)
Georgia Bulldogs basketball coaches
Georgia Pre-Flight Skycrackers football coaches
Green Bay Packers players
North Carolina Tar Heels football coaches
Notre Dame Fighting Irish football players
Notre Dame Fighting Irish men's basketball players
Players of American football from Illinois
South Carolina Gamecocks athletic directors
South Carolina Gamecocks football coaches
South Carolina Gamecocks men's basketball coaches
Sportspeople from Rockford, Illinois
United States Navy officers
United States Navy reservists
Military personnel from Illinois